Hamilton Patterson (October 13, 1877 – November 25, 1945) was a first baseman and outfielder in Major League Baseball. He played for the St. Louis Browns and Chicago White Sox.  His younger brother, Pat Patterson (baseball), born 19 years later, would have a brief career in Major League baseball as well.

External links

1877 births
1945 deaths
Major League Baseball first basemen
Major League Baseball outfielders
St. Louis Browns players
Chicago White Sox players
Baseball players from Illinois
Minor league baseball managers
Denver Grizzlies (baseball) players
Oskaloosa Quakers players
Pueblo Indians players
Chattanooga Lookouts players
Nashville Vols players
Vernon Tigers players
Venice Tigers players
St. Joseph Drummers players
Wichita Witches players
Dallas Giants players
Sportspeople from Belleville, Illinois